Langley is an suburb  near Middleton, Greater Manchester, England,  southwest of Rochdale and  northeast of Manchester city centre.

Langley is an overspill estate, created in the 1950s for Manchester City Council. Families moved into the new housing from the slum clearance areas of Manchester, the eventual population of about 25,000 doubling that of Middleton.

All the street names are adopted from different areas of the Lake District.

In 1990, Langley estate was the focus of a satanic panic and in 2006 twelve of the now-adult victims sued Rochdale Council for compensation.

The Ken Loach film Raining Stones was filmed in and around Langley in 1993.

References

Middleton, Greater Manchester
Areas of Greater Manchester
Manchester overspill estates